Blakelaw and North Fenham is a civil parish in the City of Newcastle upon Tyne in Tyne and Wear, England.  It is north west of the city centre, and is entirely surrounded by the unparished area of Newcastle upon Tyne. It covers the areas of Blakelaw, Cowgate and North Fenham, and has a population of 6,468, decreasing slightly to 6,452 at the 2011 Census.

References

External links

 Blakelaw and North Fenham Parish Council

Civil parishes in Tyne and Wear
Geography of Newcastle upon Tyne